Ikuto may refer to:

 Ikuto Noguchi, a fictional character from the anime series Digimon Data Squad
 Ikuto Tsukiyomi, a fictional character from the manga series Shugo Chara! by Peach-Pit